An Imāmzādeh refers to an immediate descendant of a Shi'i Imam in the Persian language. This Persian term is also used in Urdu and Azeri. Imamzadeh means "offspring" or descendant of an imam. There are many other ways of spelling this term in the English language, such as imamzada, imamzadah, and emamzadah. These all have the same meanings. Imamzadeh are basically the Syed's or Syeda's as they have descended from the Imams. Imamzadeh is also a term for a shrine-tomb of the descendants of Imams, who are directly related to Muhammad. These shrines are only for the descendants of imams and they are not for imams themselves. Imamzadehs are also sayyids, though not all sayyids are considered imamzadehs.

List of Imamzadehs in Iran

References 

Imamzadehs